The Valencia Orchestra is a symphony orchestra in Valencia, Spain. Founded in 1943 as the Valencia Municipal Orchestra, and a member of the Spanish Association of Symphony Orchestras (AEOS), it is not to be confused with the Orquesta de la Comunidad Valenciana, founded in 2006. The Valencia Orchestra, which first performed abroad in 1950 under José Iturbi, has toured internationally more regularly in the last 20 years. It performs mainly at the city's Palau de la Música de València, which is not to be confused with the nearby Palau de les Arts Reina Sofía.

Principal Conductors
 Joan Lamote de Grignon (1943–49)
 Hans von Benda (1949–1952)
 Napoleone Annovazzi
 Heinz Unger
 José Iturbi
 Enrique García Asensio (1964–65)
  Pedro Pírfano (1967–1970)
 Luis Antonio García Navarro (1970–74)
 Lorenzo Martínez Palomo (1974–1980)
 Benito Lauret (1980–1983)
 Manuel Galduf (1983–1997)
 Miguel Ángel Gómez Martínez (1997–2005)
 Yaron Traub (2005–2018)
 Ramón Tébar (2018– )

References
  Spanish Association of Symphony Orchestras.
  Xàtiva town hall.

Spanish orchestras
Musical groups established in 1943
Valencian culture